Jhonata is a given name. It may refer to:

 Jhonata (footballer) (born 1992), Jhonata de Lima Ferreira, Brazilian football defensive midfielder
 Jhonata Varela (born 2000), Brazilian football defensive midfielder

See also
 Jonathan (disambiguation)